Wu Yao-ting (20 June 1926 – 4 February 2012) was a Taiwanese businessman, best known as the founder of the President Department Store and other companies such as supermarket, hotel, and various food industry businesses.

In 1958, Wu established the department store Ta Shing (大新百貨), the first department store in Taiwan to have an escalator. In 1975, he subsequently established the President Department Store (大統百貨), the largest department store in Taiwan at that time. In 1984, Wu founded the Talee Department Store (大立百貨), which later became a Japanese-style department store Talee-Isetan (大立伊勢丹).

Additionally, Wu also founded Hotel Kingdom (華王飯店) and collaborated with Costco in Taiwan to operate several warehouse supermarkets.  The department stores, hotels, supermarkets and shopping malls established by Wu are now being managed by the President Group (大統集團).

Wu died at Kaohsiung General Veterans Hospital (高雄榮民總醫院) on 4 February 2012.

References

1926 births
2012 deaths
20th-century Taiwanese businesspeople
21st-century Taiwanese businesspeople
Businesspeople from Tainan